Jisaku Okada (岡田 次作, 1893 – June 4, 1942) was an Imperial Japanese Navy captain. During his career he was the commander of the seaplane tender Notoro and aircraft carrier Ryūjō. A couple of months before the start of the Second World War he was given the command of the Kaga. He was killed in action during the Battle of Midway when the ship was attacked by American dive bombers. Okada was posthumously promoted to Rear admiral.

References

Imperial Japanese Navy officers
1897 births
1942 deaths
Battle of Midway
Captains who went down with the ship
Imperial Japanese Navy personnel of World War II
Japanese military personnel killed in World War II
Deaths by airstrike during World War II